The Battle of Dettingen took place on 27 June 1743 during the War of the Austrian Succession at Dettingen in the Electorate of Mainz, Holy Roman Empire (now Karlstein am Main in Bavaria). It was fought between a Pragmatic Army, composed of the British, Hanoverian and Austrian troops, and a French army commanded by the duc de Noailles.

While the Earl of Stair exercised operational control, the Allied army was nominally commanded by George II, accompanied by his son the Duke of Cumberland. As a result, it is now best remembered as the last time a reigning British monarch led troops in combat. Despite being an Allied victory, the battle had little effect on the wider war, and has been described as 'a happy escape, rather than a great victory.'

Background

The immediate cause of the War of the Austrian Succession was the death in 1740 of Emperor Charles VI, last in the direct line of male Habsburgs, leaving his eldest daughter, Maria Theresa, as heir to the Habsburg monarchy. Prior to 1713, the Monarchy was subject to Salic law, whereby women were barred from the succession. The Pragmatic Sanction of 1713 allowed Maria Theresa to inherit the throne, but the ruling was challenged by Charles Albert of Bavaria, the closest male heir.

An internal dynastic dispute became a European issue since the Monarchy formed the most powerful single element in the Holy Roman Empire. A federation of mostly German states, it was headed by the Holy Roman emperor, in theory an elected position but held by the Habsburgs since 1440. In January 1742, Charles of Bavaria became the first non-Habsburg emperor in 300 years, with the support of France, Prussia and Saxony. Maria Theresa was backed by the so-called Pragmatic Allies, which in addition to Austria included Britain, Hanover and the Dutch Republic.

In December 1740, Prussia invaded the Austrian province of Silesia, whose mining, weaving and dyeing industries provided 10% of total Imperial income. France, Saxony and Bavaria occupied Habsburg territories in Bohemia, while Spain joined the war, hoping to regain possessions in Northern Italy lost to Austria in 1713. By early 1742, Austria's position seemed desperate; Britain agreed to send a naval squadron to the Mediterranean and 17,000 troops to the Austrian Netherlands, under the Earl of Stair.

However, Austria made peace with Prussia in the June 1742 Treaty of Breslau; by December, they occupied most of Bavaria while the French armies were devastated by disease. The focus of the 1743 campaign switched to Germany; the Austrians defeated the Bavarians at Simbach and in mid-June, the Allied army arrived at Aschaffenburg, on the north bank of the River Main. Here they were joined by George II, who was attending the coronation of a new Elector of Mainz. By late June, the Allies were running short of supplies and began their withdrawal towards the nearest supply depot at Hanau. The road ran through Dettingen, where the French commander Noailles, positioned 23,000 troops under his nephew Gramont.

Battle

Around 1:00 am on 27 June, the Allies left Aschaffenburg in three columns, and marched along the north bank of the Main, heading for Hanau. The French position at Dettingen was extremely strong; De Gramont's infantry held a line anchored on the village, and running to the Spessart Heights, with the cavalry on level ground to their left. Noailles instructed de Vallière to place his guns on the south bank of the Main, which allowed them to fire into the left flank of the Pragmatic army.

Inadequate reconnaissance was a problem for the Allies throughout the war, and the French presence in Dettingen took them by surprise. Their danger became clear when Noailles sent another 12,000 troops over the River Main at Aschaffenburg, into the Allied rear; he had high hopes of destroying their entire army. Ilton, commander of the Allied infantry, ordered the British and Hanoverian Foot Guards back to Aschaffenburg, while the remainder changed from column of march into four lines to attack the French position. As they did so, they were fired on by the French artillery, although this caused relatively few casualties.

Despite being ordered three times by Noailles to hold their position, around midday the elite Maison du Roi cavalry charged the Allied lines. Who initiated it is disputed, de Gramont being the most common choice; French historian De Périni suggests the Maison de Roi, who not seen action since Malplaquet in 1709, saw an opportunity to win the battle on their own and led by the duc d'Harcourt, they broke through the first three lines, throwing the inexperienced British cavalry into confusion. 

They were followed by the Gardes Françaises infantry, in a disjointed and piecemeal attack which forced de Vallière to cease fire for fear of hitting his own troops, allowing the British infantry in the fourth line to hold their ground. A Hanoverian artillery battery began firing at close range into the French infantry, while an Austrian brigade took them in the flank. After three hours of fighting, the French retreated to the left bank of the Main, most of their casualties occurring when one of the bridges collapsed. The Pragmatic Army continued towards Hanau; although it has been suggested that they could have exploited their victory, they were in no shape to attempt a contested river crossing. Their precarious position was demonstrated by the need to abandon their wounded in order to move faster.

Aftermath

Although George II handed out numerous promotions and rewards to his subordinates, Dettingen was a lucky escape. The Allies, short of supplies and in retreat, had escaped, but had to abandon their wounded, and would have suffered a serious defeat if Noailles' orders had been followed. Unable to agree how to best exploit their victory, they ended by doing nothing, and in October, took up winter quarters in the Netherlands.

It was the last battle for several senior officers; in 1744, Noailles was appointed Foreign Minister, while de Gramont was killed at Fontenoy in 1745. The 70 year old Stair retired, and was replaced by the equally elderly George Wade. Only the infantry's training and discipline saved the army from destruction and one of the training companies at the Royal Military Academy Sandhurst is named 'Dettingen' in recognition of this fact.

In honour of the battle, and his patron George II, Handel composed the Dettingen Te Deum and Dettingen Anthem.

Notes

References

Sources
 
 
 
 
 
 
 
 
 
 
 
 
 
 
 
 
 
 
 
 
 

Battles of the War of the Austrian Succession
Conflicts in 1743
Battles involving Austria
Battles involving France
Battles involving Hanover
Battles involving Great Britain
Battles in Bavaria
1743 in the Holy Roman Empire
18th century in Bavaria
History of Franconia